The Line of Freedom is a 2013 political drama film directed and produced by David Whitney and starring Antonio Aakeel. The film had its world premiere at the Dubai International Film Festival in 2013. It was instantly banned in Pakistan due to the controversial depiction of its security forces and subsequently contributed to a national ban of the Internet Movie Database. The film has sparked a backlash from some titling it "anti-state propaganda" and resulted in its star Antonio Aakeel, and others who had helped in the production allegedly receiving death threats.

Plot
The film follows the true story of Nasir Baloch, a young student rights activist murdered by the Pakistani Army in 2011 as part of their 'kill and dump' policy in Balochistan, southwest Pakistan. Nasir Baloch is abducted and tortured by his countries security forces. Days later, he is shot and left for dead in the desert, but incredibly survives to tell his story.

Cast 
 Antonio Aakeel as Nasir Baloch
 Mansoor Alfeeli as Pervez
 Tony Hasnath as Rasool
 Fatima Al Taei as Hani
 Omar Malik as Gul
 Nitin Mirani as Private Sajjad
 Omar Bin Haider as Private Malik
 Ibrahim Renno Private Amjad
 Yousuf Murad Baloch as doctor

Production 
The Line of Freedom was developed by DWF productions with UNPO human rights ambassadors Noordin Mengal and Bhawal Mengal. The film was shot in September 2012 at an undisclosed location somewhere in the Middle East.

Release
A short version of the feature was released online in 2013.

References

External links 
 

2013 films
British action films
British drama films
2010s crime thriller films
Films set in Pakistan
Films shot in Dubai
2010s English-language films
British crime thriller films
2010s British films